Kakvo tijelo Selma ima (What A Body Selma Has) is the fifth studio album by Bosnian pop-folk singer Selma Bajrami. It was released in 2004.

The title track was released as a single and made her a sensation and household name in the Balkans.

In 2010, a demo version of the song "Muška suza" (A Man's Tears) sung by Serbian singer Dragana Mirković, was leaked on YouTube.

Track listing
Kakvo tijelo Selma ima (What a Body Selma Has)
Žalim (I Regret)
Tijelo uz tijelo (Body Against Body)
Muška suza (A Man's Tear)
Kada iza sebe pogledam (When I Look Behind Myself)
Ljubavi jedina (Only Love)
Divlji zov (Call of the Wild)
Prva ljubav (First Love)

References

2004 albums
Selma Bajrami albums
Hayat Production albums